Michael John Strachan Bryce,  (21 June 1938 – 15 January 2021) was an Australian architect and graphic and industrial designer. He was the husband of the 25th governor-general of Australia, Dame Quentin Bryce.

Early life and career
Michael Bryce was born in Brisbane, Queensland, and attended Gordonvale State School in north Queensland, and Brisbane State High School. He gained a Bachelor of Architecture degree from the University of Queensland in 1962. He returned to Australia and started an architecture practice in 1968. His practice won awards for graphic and environmental design, including the Civic Design Award, the Australian Institute of Architects (RAIA) House of the Year Award, and the RAIA President's Award. The practice also received citations in the RAIA, DIA and AGDA awards, as well as the Honor Award of the United States Society of Environmental Graphic Design.

In 1988, Bryce joined his practice with those of Marcello Minale and Brian Tattersfield in London to form Minale Tattersfield Bryce and Partners.  In 1998 he was a member of the judging panel for a design competition for an alternative National Australian Flag, run by Ausflag. He was principal design adviser to the Sydney 2000 Olympic Games, personally designing the stylised "Opera House" Olympic bid logo, and advising on the application of the corporate branding. His later firm, Minale Bryce, does graphic and industrial designing.

Among his other designs and clients have been:
 signage for the Brisbane 1982 Commonwealth Games
 the Brisbane bid for the 1992 Olympic Games
 the Dolphins (Australian swimming team)
 PGA Tour (golf)
 the logo for the Wallabies rugby union team
 the International Cricket Council (logo for the 2007 Cricket World Cup)
 Oceania Football
 the ringtail possum logo for the Queensland Parks and Wildlife Service
 the logo for the Government of Queensland (sometimes referred to as the "Beattie-burger")
 Harrods, London
 fashion brands Fendi and Valentino
 San Pellegrino
 FA Premier League
 Rhône-Poulenc
 Bluewater, Kent
 the Eurostar train
 Sydney Airport
 Doha Stadium.

In 1977 Bryce was elected inaugural Queensland President of the Design Institute of Australia and Federal President in 1979. He was a life fellow of the institute, a life fellow of the Royal Australian Institute of Architects, and a fellow of the Royal Society of Arts.

Bryce was appointed an Adjunct Professor of Design at the Queensland College of Art (Griffith University), the School of Design and Architecture at the University of Canberra and the College of Fine Arts at the University of New South Wales.

Bryce retired from Minale Bryce in September 2008, following his wife's appointment as Governor-General of Australia. The day after her swearing-in, he announced he would be selling his design practice in order to avoid "any breath of conflict of interests".

In 2010 Bryce became Patron of the Australian Institute of Architects.

Other activities and interests
At university, Bryce joined the Royal Australian Air Force Reserve as a member of the Queensland University Squadron, and later joined the No. 23 (City of Brisbane) Squadron. While with the RAAF Reserve he was appointed as honorary Aide-de-Camp to the governor of Queensland. He was a former patron of the Royal Australian Air Force Association in Queensland, a trustee of the Queensland Art Gallery and a member of the boards of the Queensland Symphony Orchestra and Queensland Orchestra. He served as a ministerial adviser on the Child Accident Prevention Foundation and as the founding president of Melanoma Patients Australia.

Personal life
Bryce married Quentin Strachan on 12 December 1964; the couple had two daughters and three sons.

Bryce died on 15 January 2021, aged 82, after a long illness.

Honours
In 2003, Bryce was conferred with the degree of doctor of the university honoris causa by the University of Canberra. He was honoured by Indesign Magazine as a luminary. In 2006, he was inducted into the Design Institute of Australia Hall of Fame.

References

Sources
 Governor-General of the Commonwealth of Australia
 Government House, Queensland
 ABC Queensland
 

1938 births
2021 deaths
Australian graphic designers
Spouses of Australian Governors-General
Spouses of Queensland Governors
Members of the Order of Australia
People from Brisbane
Royal Australian Air Force officers
University of Queensland alumni
Architects from Queensland
People educated at Brisbane State High School